Jim Ned Pettigrew (August 25, 1881 – August 20, 1952) was an American Major League Baseball player who pinch hit in two games for the Buffalo Buffeds in . He was a Minor League Baseball outfielder from 1905 to 1921, and managed in the minors as well.

Career
Pettigrew made his professional baseball debut in 1905, playing for the Guthrie Senators of the Western Association. He played for several teams in the Association until 1909, when he moved to the Topeka Jayhawks of the Western League. Pettigrew played for the Wichita Jobbers in 1910 and 1912, spending 1911 in the Northwestern League. In 1913, he played for the Chicago Keeleys of the Federal League. In April 1914, Pettigrew was purchased by the Buffalo Buffeds of the Federal League. He played in only two games for Buffalo, being used as a pinch hitter. He went hitless in two at bats. He returned to the minors for the remainder of his career, spending time with several teams. Both during and after his playing career, Pettigrew managed five minor league teams.

As manager of the Cushing Refiners in 1924, Pettigrew gave a tryout to 20 year old Carl Hubbell, who hadn't pitched since high school. Pettigrew signed Hubbell, who went on to a Baseball Hall of Fame career.

References

External links

Retrosheet
Obituary

1881 births
1952 deaths
Buffalo Buffeds players
Detroit Tigers scouts
Guthrie Senators players
Hutchinson Salt Packers players
Wichita Jobbers players
Topeka Jayhawks players
Portland Pippins players
Wichita Witches players
Chicago Keeleys players
Moline Plowboys players
Rockford Rox players
Chickasha Chicks players
Independence Producers players
Baseball players from Texas
People from Honey Grove, Texas
Cushing Refiners players